Giaretta is an Italian surname. Notable people with the surname include:

Diego Giaretta (born 1983), Brazilian footballer
Giorgio Giaretta (1912–1981), Italian footballer
Paolo Giaretta (born 1947), Italian politician

Italian-language surnames